Walk of shame refers to a situation in which a person must walk past strangers or peers alone, usually after having had casual sex. 

Walk of shame or Walk of Shame may also refer to:

Walk of Shame (film), 2014
"Walk of Shame" (song), a song by Pink from her album The Truth About Love
"Walk of Shame", a song by The Like from their album Release Me
Walk of Shame, 2011 country music album by Nikki Lane
The exit a player makes after being voted out on The Weakest Link.
"Walkashame", a song by Meghan Trainor from her album Title

See also
Shame (disambiguation)